Phymorhynchus buccinoides is a species of sea snail, a marine gastropod mollusk in the family Raphitomidae.

The Japanese name of this species is Tsubunari-shajiku.

Description

Distribution
The type locality is off Hatsushima, Sagami Bay, 35°00.2' N, 139°13.5' E, Japan in depth 1160 m.

There is no known other locality up to 2005.

It lives in seeps.

References

External links
 

buccinoides
Gastropods described in 1993